Age management medicine is a field of alternative medicine. It is not recognized by the American Medical Association.

Terminology
Other names for the field include "antiaging medicine", "regenerative medicine", and "longevity".

Criticisms
Age management medicine is controversial. The field is underregulated and supported by insufficient scientific evidence. People who practice it open themselves up to legal liability on grounds of negligence–malpractice, warranty issues, and product liability. The use of growth hormone has been frequently recommended; however, such use is associated with cancer.
Age management medicine is often promoted by anti-aging practitioners specializing in nutritional supplements and hormone-replacement, a practice that may lead to harmful side-effects.

See also
 Life extension
 Anti-aging movement

References

Emerging technologies
Life extension
Medical treatments
Medical controversies
Ageing
Population
Anti-aging substances
Transhumanism